Paratorna dorcas is a species of moth of the family Tortricidae. It is found in Indonesia (Java) and India (Assam).

References

Moths described in 1907
Tortricini
Moths of Asia
Moths of Indonesia
Taxa named by Edward Meyrick